Mahir Çağrı (born 1962) is a Turkish individual who became an Internet celebrity in 1999. His picture-laden personal homepage, which exclaimed, in broken English, his love of the accordion, travel, and women, was visited by millions and spawned numerous fansites and parodies, one of which was featured on Fox's MadTV (season 5, episode 20). He was also repeatedly parodied in 1999 on episodes of the Late Show with David Letterman, wearing red Speedos and playing ping-pong. Çağrı was ranked #2 in CNET's Top 10 Web fads. The site was also included in PC World's "The 25 Worst Web Sites" list.

Çağrı claimed in various interviews that his personal webpage was hacked, with additions such as "I like sex" embedded into his webpage. The site was originally hosted on the now defunct XOOM web hosting service which advertised Çağrı on its front page during the mania.

Çağrı was used in British TV advertising for smartgroups.com by St. Luke's advertising agency.

Similarities to Borat

Çağrı has stated that Sacha Baron Cohen's character Borat was based on him, and is therefore owed some sort of royalties for use of his likeness. However, Cohen had been developing a similar character since 1996 on the show F2F, before the Mahir webpage was published.

See also
 Internet celebrity
 Internet meme
 List of Internet phenomena

References

External links
I Kiss You at web.archive.org

News
 Mahir to Borat: I Sue You! - Wired Magazine, 14.11
 The Story Behind The “I Kiss You” Home Page And How It Made Mahir Cagri The World’s First Internet Celebrity - MethodShop
 Evidence for a Mahir vs. Borat Lawsuit - Electronic News Network
 Will the real Borat please stand up? - Reuters January 19, 2007
 "Real Borat" hopes to make film - BBC November 9, 2006
 İnternet Mahir BBC'de: Ben de kendi filmimi yapmak istiyorum

1962 births
Internet memes introduced in the 1990s
Living people
People from İzmir
Turkish Internet celebrities